Bis(chloromethyl) ether is an organic compound with the chemical formula (CH2Cl)2O. It is a colourless liquid with an unpleasant suffocating odour and it is one of the chloroalkyl ethers. Bis(chloromethyl) ether was once produced on a large scale, but was found to be highly carcinogenic and thus such production has ceased.

Synthesis
It was produced industrially from paraformaldehyde and a mixture of chlorosulfonic acid and sulfuric acid. It is also produced as a byproduct in the Blanc chloromethylation reaction, formed when formaldehyde (the monomer, paraformaldehyde or formalin) and concentrated hydrochloric acid are mixed, and is a known impurity in technical grade chloromethyl methyl ether.

Because of their carcinogenic potency, the industrial production of chloromethyl ethers ended in most countries in the early 1980s. Bis(chloromethyl) ether was no exception to this with production in the U.S.A. ending in 1982.

Uses
Bis(chloromethyl) ether has been extensively used in chemical synthesis, primarily as a crosslinking agent in the manufacture of ion-exchange resins and in the textile industry. It was also used as a linker in the synthesis of certain nerve agent antidotes (asoxime chloride, obidoxime).
Bis(chloromethyl) was also effective for chloromethylation of aromatic substrates.

Safety
Bis(chloromethyl) ether is carcinogenic. It is one of 13 chemicals considered an OSHA-regulated occupational carcinogen. Chronic exposure has been linked to in increased risk of lung cancer.

It is classified as an extremely hazardous substance in the United States as defined in Section 302 of the U.S. Emergency Planning and Community Right-to-Know Act (42 U.S.C. 11002), and is subject to strict reporting requirements by facilities which produce, store, or use it in significant quantities.

See also
 Chloromethyl methyl ether - CH2ClOMe
 Bis(chloroethyl) ether - (CH2ClCH2)2O

References

IARC Group 1 carcinogens
Alkylating agents
Organochlorides
Ethers
Reagents for organic chemistry
Foul-smelling chemicals